The fourth season of the Date A Live anime series, titled Date A Live IV, was produced by Geek Toys and directed by Jun Nakagawa. Like the rest of the series, it follows the adventures of Shido Itsuka and the Spirits, supernatural female entities that have fallen in love with him. The season was scheduled to premiere in October 2021, but was delayed to April 2022 for "various reasons". Fumihiko Shimo wrote the fourth season's scripts, with Naoto Nakamura designing the characters and Go Sakabe returning to compose the series' music. It aired from April 8 to June 24, 2022. The opening theme is titled "OveR" performed by Miyu Tomita, and the ending theme is titled "S.O.S" performed by sweet ARMS. On April 21, 2022, Crunchyroll announced that the season would receive an English dub, which premiered the following day.


Episode list

Notes

References

External links
  
 

2022 Japanese television seasons
Anime postponed due to the COVID-19 pandemic
4